The Materials for Industry - Derek Birchall Award is awarded biennially to an individual who has made an exceptional contribution to the application of materials chemistry in industry. The recipient of the award is chosen by an independent committee consisting of experts from both the Materials Chemistry Division (MCD) and industry. The award is given by the Royal Society of Chemistry and the chosen winner is rewarded with a monetary prize of £2000.

Award History 

The award was established in 2008, in honour of work carried out by British inventor and materials chemist Derek Birchall (born 1930).

Awardees 
Source: RSC

See also

 List of chemistry awards

References 

Awards of the Royal Society of Chemistry